The Royal Family is the fourth compilation album by Suburban Noize Records, released on August 10, 2004.

Track listing

(*) indicates Japanese Release Only

References

2004 compilation albums
Suburban Noize Records compilation albums
Hip hop compilation albums
Alternative rock compilation albums